North Brother Island may refer to:

 North Brother Island (Andaman and Nicobar Islands), in the Andaman Islands, Indian Ocean
 North Brother Island, Connecticut, US
 North and South Brother Islands (New York City), in New York, US
 North Brother (Chagos Bank), one of the Three Brothers islands in the Chagos Archipelago, British Indian Ocean Territory
 North Brother, one of the Rukan Islands in Indonesia
 North Brother Island, one of The Brothers islands in New Zealand

See also
 Brother Island (disambiguation)
 South Brother Island (disambiguation)